Sir John Robert Gladstone, 3rd Baronet (26 April 1852 – 25 June 1926) was the son of Sir Thomas Gladstone, an older brother of the Liberal Prime Minister William Ewart Gladstone, and Louisa Fellowes.

He attended the state funeral of his uncle, W. E. Gladstone, in 1898. Like his father, Gladstone was Lord Lieutenant of Kincardineshire, and was also a Justice of the Peace (JP) in that county. He was a captain in the 1st Battalion, the Coldstream Guards, and was a brigadier in the Royal Company of Archers. He succeeded his father as baronet on 20 March 1889.

He died on 25 June 1926 aged 74. He never married, so the title passed to his cousin, John Evelyn Gladstone.

References

External links
Gladstone on The Peerage.com website
Gladstone in the National Archives

Baronets in the Baronetage of the United Kingdom
Lord-Lieutenants of Kincardineshire
1852 births
1926 deaths
People educated at Eton College
Alumni of Christ Church, Oxford
English people of Scottish descent
Coldstream Guards officers
John Gladstone, 3rd Baronet
Members of the Royal Company of Archers